Common names: El Muerto Island speckled rattlesnake.

Crotalus mitchellii muertensis is a venomous pitviper subspecies endemic to El Muerto Island, Mexico. It is sometimes treated as a full species, Crotalus muertensis.

Description

Geographic range
Known only from the type locality, which is "El Muerto Island, Gulf of California, Mexico."

Habitat
It is common in all habitats within the El Muerto Island: rocks and rubble of talus slopes, scrub, hill ridges, and the intertidal zone.

Conservation status
This species is classified as Least Concern (LC) on the IUCN Red List of Threatened Species. Species are listed as such due to their wide distribution, presumed large population, or because it is unlikely to be declining fast enough to qualify for listing in a more threatened category.

References

Further reading
 Klauber, L.M. 1949. Some new and revived subspecies of rattlesnakes. Trans. San Diego Soc. Nat. Hist. 11(6): 61-116.

mitchellii muertensis
Endemic reptiles of Mexico
Endemic fauna of the Baja California Peninsula
Fauna of Gulf of California islands